The Pinyon Mountains are a mountain range in eastern San Diego County, Southern California. The range is protected within Anza Borrego Desert State Park.

The Pinyon Mountains are in the ecotone of the Colorado Desert ecoregion (from east) and of the California montane chaparral and woodlands ecoregion (from west). They are in the rain shadow of the taller Peninsular Ranges.

References 

Mountain ranges of the Colorado Desert
Mountain ranges of San Diego County, California
Anza-Borrego Desert State Park